Ramón Torres Méndez (29 August 1809 – 16 December 1885) was a Colombian painter and lithographer considered one of the most prolific and important costumbrismo artists of the 19th century in Colombia, best known for his genre works into everyday Colombian life documenting the costumes, occupations, and pastimes of the common people of his time.

Further reading

References

 
1809 births
1885 deaths
People from Bogotá
Colombian caricaturists
Colombian lithographers
Colombian genre painters
Colombian painters
Portrait miniaturists
19th-century Colombian painters
19th-century male artists
Colombian male painters